The 2007–08 Georgian Cup (also known as the David Kipiani Cup) was the sixty-fourth season overall and eighteenth since independence of the Georgian annual football tournament. The competition began on 4 August 2007 and ended with the Final held on 16 May 2008. The defending champions are Ameri Tbilisi.

First round 

|}

Group stage

Group A

Group B

Group C

Group D

Quarterfinals 
The matches were played from 17 to 19 February (first legs) and on 11 and 12 March 2008 (second legs).

|}

Semifinals 
The matches were played on 8 and 9 April (first legs) and 7 May 2008 (second legs).

|}

Final

See also 
 2007–08 Umaglesi Liga
 2007–08 Pirveli Liga

External links 
 The Rec.Sport.Soccer Statistics Foundation.
 es.geofootball.com 

Georgian Cup seasons
Cup
Georgian Cup, 2007-08